The 2018 Dutch TT was the eighth round of the 2018 MotoGP season. It was held at the TT Circuit Assen in Assen on 1 July 2018.

Classification

MotoGP

 Franco Morbidelli suffered a broken finger in a crash during free practice and was declared unfit to start the race.

Moto2

 Niki Tuuli suffered a broken finger in a crash during qualifying and withdrew from the event.
 Xavier Cardelús suffered a broken collarbone in a crash during qualifying and withdrew from the event.
 Tetsuta Nagashima suffered a hand injury in a crash during free practice and withdrew from the event.

Moto3

Championship standings after the race

MotoGP

Moto2

Moto3

Notes

References

Dutch
TT
Dutch TT
Dutch TT